Kuzman Knoll (Kuzmanova Mogila \'kuz-ma-no-va mo-'gi-la\) is a solitary ice-covered knoll rising to 620 m in eastern Livingston Island in the South Shetland Islands, Antarctica.  The knoll forms a conspicuous landmark in Wörner Gap area, overlooking Huron Glacier and upper Perunika Glacier.  It was named after Kuzman Tuhchiev, participant in the 1993/94 Bulgarian Antarctic campaign and base commander at St. Kliment Ohridski during the 1994-96 seasons.

The feature is named ‘Tukhchiev Knoll’ by the U.S. and British Antarctic naming committees; "Kuzman Knoll" is the official Bulgarian name, which is established among the Spanish and Bulgarian scientists working in the area.

First ascent by the Bulgarians Kuzman Tuhchiev and Vasil Gurev from St. Kliment Ohridski Base during the 1994/95 season.

Location

Maps
 South Shetland Islands. Scale 1:200000 topographic map. DOS 610 Sheet W 62 60. Tolworth, UK, 1968.
 Islas Livingston y Decepción.  Mapa topográfico a escala 1:100000.  Madrid: Servicio Geográfico del Ejército, 1991.
 S. Soccol, D. Gildea and J. Bath. Livingston Island, Antarctica. Scale 1:100000 satellite map. The Omega Foundation, USA, 2004.
 L.L. Ivanov et al., Antarctica: Livingston Island and Greenwich Island, South Shetland Islands (from English Strait to Morton Strait, with illustrations and ice-cover distribution), 1:100000 scale topographic map, Antarctic Place-names Commission of Bulgaria, Sofia, 2005
 L.L. Ivanov. Antarctica: Livingston Island and Greenwich, Robert, Snow and Smith Islands. Scale 1:120000 topographic map. Troyan: Manfred Wörner Foundation, 2010.  (First edition 2009. )
 Antarctic Digital Database (ADD). Scale 1:250000 topographic map of Antarctica. Scientific Committee on Antarctic Research (SCAR), 1993–2016.

References
Kuzman Knoll. SCAR Composite Antarctic Gazetteer
 Bulgarian Antarctic Gazetteer. Antarctic Place-names Commission. (details in Bulgarian, basic data in English)

External links
 Kuzman Knoll. Copernix satellite image

Hills of Livingston Island